Liuyang High-Tech Industrial Development Zone is a Hi-tech Industrial Development Zone at province level in Liuyang City, Hunan Province, China. It is the 2nd largest industrial zone of Liuyang by economic volume, after the Liuyang Economic and Technological Development Zone. The industrial zone is the original Liuyang Manufacturing industrial Base created in 2003, it was Changed to the present name on 14 July 2016. As of 2015, its gross output value of industries is CNY 30.31 billion (US$4.87 billion), the financial revenue reaches 1.01 billion yuan (US$0.16 billion).

References 

Liuyang
Economy of Changsha
2003 establishments in China